The Boa Vista Island Opening Tournament (Portuguese: Torneio de Abertura da Boa Vista, Capeverdean Crioulo, ALUPEC or ALUPEK: Turnéu di Abertura di Bubista), is an opening tournament competition (equivalent to a league cup) played during the season in the island of Boa Vista, Cape Verde  The competition is organized by the Boa Vista Regional Football Association.  Some seasons featured rounds of one portion, some seasons featured three rounds and two groups with the top club of each group in the final match.  It currently consists of seven rounds, a meeting with another club once.  The winner with the most points (sometimes in the final) is the winner.

The first edition took place in 2000 and was the second regional competition after the championships.

Winners

See also
Boa Vista Island Championships
Boa Vista Island Cup
Boa Vista Island Super Cup

Notes

References

Sport in Boa Vista, Cape Verde
Football cup competitions in Cape Verde
2000 establishments in Cape Verde